EA Mobile Inc. is an American video game development studio of the publisher Electronic Arts (EA) for mobile platforms.

The studio's primary business is producing games for mobile phones. It has also produced other entertainment-related software such as ringtone applications, as well as games for other platforms such as PDAs and personal computers. EA Mobile produces games in a wide variety of genres, such as fighting games, puzzle games, and sports titles. Their most well-known products to date include The Sims, Need for Speed, and FIFA as well as a mobile conversion of the widely known puzzle game Bejeweled, a conversion for Pocket PC of the PC game Worms World Party and their NFL, NBA, and MLB -branded games, in addition to holding the license for the mobile versions of Tetris and various Monopoly games. Tetris by EA Mobile is the best-selling paid mobile game of all time, and third best-selling game of all time altogether. They have relationships with all major North American wireless service carriers, such as Sprint, Verizon, and AT&T, as well as many minor North American and some major European and Asian carriers. They have offices in Los Angeles, Montreal, London, Tokyo, Hyderabad, Honolulu, Bucharest and São Paulo.

As a publishing company in the wireless video game industry, EA Mobile's primary service is linking game developers, who generally develop the games from idea to playable software, with wireless telecommunications service providers or "carriers", who sell the games to their customers. To this end, they maintain strong relationships with major companies in both groups. In addition, they create, purchase, and maintain proprietary software libraries to aid developers with whom they have working relationships, a common practice among electronic game publishers. They also do the majority of the work regarding quality assurance for their games.

History

Foundation
EA Mobile was founded in 2004 by a group of EA company veterans. The group was formed/led by John Batter (General Manager) and included Linda Chaplin (head of US sales), Lincoln Wallen (CTO), John Burn (head of European sales), Jay Miller (US sales) and Mike McCabe (head of Asian sales). EA Mobile launched the division and products simultaneously in the US, Europe and Asia.

JAMDAT acquisition
In 2006, EA Mobile expanded its footprint by acquiring JAMDAT Mobile. JAMDAT was founded by Scott Lahman and Zack Norman, two ex-Activision executives, and Austin Murray in March 2000. They were joined in November of that year by Mitch Lasky, who had also worked at Activision, who became the CEO of JAMDAT. JAMDAT went public in late 2003 and gained immediate success after the release of several The Lord of the Rings tie-in mobile games.

On December 9, 2005, EA announced their purchase of JAMDAT for $680 million. The acquisition closed on February 14, 2006, and the JAMDAT name was retired.

Further expansion
On August 8, 2007, it was announced that Barry Cottle will join EA Mobile as the new Senior Vice President and General Manager.

In October 2010, EA Mobile announced the acquisition of UK based iPhone and iPad games publisher 'Chillingo' for US$20 million in cash. While Chillingo publishes the popular Cut the Rope game, the deal did not include those properties.

In July 2015, Samantha Ryan became the new SVP and General Manager of EA Mobile replacing Frank Gibeau. And the following year in a restructuring across parent company, EA, she also added oversight of Maxis, and BioWare.

As of 2017, EA Mobile have an annual revenue topping almost $700 million and employees around 800 people.

In May 2022 it was announced that EA Mobile along with EA Capital Games shall partner with Middle-earth Enterprises to release a new mobile RPG titled The Lord of the Rings: Heroes of Middle-earth.

See also
 Gameloft

References

External links
 EA Mobile official website

2004 establishments in California
American companies established in 2004
Companies based in Los Angeles
Electronic Arts
Mobile game companies
Video game companies established in 2004
Video game development companies